"Took My Love" is a song by English electronic music group Bizarre Inc, featuring guest lead vocals by English singer Angie Brown. It was released in February 1993 as the third single from the group's second studio album, Energique (1992). The single went to number 19 on the UK Singles Chart and number-one for two weeks on the US Billboard Dance Club Songs chart. It was also number-one in Canada, peaking at the top of the RPM Dance/Urban chart for six weeks.

Critical reception
Ned Raggett from AllMusic stated that singer Angie Brown "does another good vocal turn on the ["I'm Gonna Get You"] similarly-arranged" song. In his weekly UK chart commentary, James Masterton wrote, "The decision of the techno duo to get themselves a guest vocalist with a real voice reaped obvious dividends when "I'm Gonna Get You" hit No.3 back in October. The new single is basically more of the same, following a proper song structure but still a track to storm the clubs and the airwaves. Watch this go Top Ten." Sam Wood from Philadelphia Inquirer viewed it as an "attempt at more conventional dance pop", and concluded, "They're intended for pop radio airplay, not the rave dance floors where lyrics tend to snap dancers out of their hard-won trances."

Charts

Weekly charts

Year-end charts

See also
 List of number-one dance singles of 1993 (U.S.)
 List of number-one dance singles of 1993 (Canada)

References

1992 songs
1993 singles
Bizarre Inc songs
Sony Music singles